Sinner's Serenade is the first album by the Finnish metal band Eternal Tears of Sorrow. It was recorded and mixed in only five days – the three last songs, from Bard's Burial demo tape, in just one day and the rest of the songs in four days. It was released by X-treme records, a Gothenburg-based label.

Track listing

Credits 
 Altti Veteläinen − vocals, bass
 Jarmo Puolakanaho − guitar, keyboards
 Olli-Pekka Törrö − guitar, keyboards

References 

1997 debut albums
Eternal Tears of Sorrow albums